Delta College is a public community college in University Center, Michigan.

History
Delta College's district had its beginning in 1955 with Saginaw, Midland, and Bay counties making up the district.  In 1957, the voters of the tri-counties approved the construction of the college, and it opened for classes in 1961. Delta College replaced Bay City Junior College, established in 1922, because the junior college could no longer support the growing enrollment. With Saginaw Valley College established in 1964, later renamed Saginaw Valley State College in 1975, and finally named Saginaw Valley State University. In 1987, both Delta College and Saginaw Valley State University form University Center, Michigan.

In 1967, the college opened two residence halls on the campus. Occupancy of the dorms peaked in 1980 at 178 students. 85 students were in the residence halls in 1990. The following year, one of the halls was closed with the second dorm closing in 1993.

Governance
Delta College is a community college with its district consisting of Saginaw, Midland and Bay counties. The board of trustees is made up of nine trustees, three from each county.

Downtown Centers
Delta College has remote campuses in each of its three neighboring counties: Delta College Planetarium in downtown Bay City; Delta College Midland Center in downtown Midland; and Delta College Saginaw Center in downtown Saginaw. The former Ricker Center in Saginaw was closed following the opening of the Downtown location.

Athletics
Delta College offers six varsity sports competing in the NJCAA, and is in the MCCAA's conference. The Pioneers compete in men's basketball and women's basketball, baseball, softball, women's soccer and men's golf. Delta has won two national championships, in men's basketball in 1989 and softball in 1999. The women's soccer team and baseball teams were added as varsity sports during the 2011–2012 academic year.

Media
The college owns and operates WDCQ-TV, the region's PBS station; and WUCX-FM, the NPR affiliate, owned by Central Michigan University (CMU) and co-operated by Delta College and CMU. Collectively, these stations are known as Delta College Public Media and they serve an audience of 1.2 million people in mid-Michigan.

The college's student-run newspaper is the Delta Collegiate and has been published since the college opened in 1961. The newspaper prints a new issue every two weeks during the fall and winter semester. The Library Learning Information Center (LLIC) now has an online archive of the first 50 years of the Delta Collegiate.

See also
 WDCQ-TV
 WUCX-FM

References

External links

 

Community colleges in Michigan
Michigan Community College Athletic Association
Education in Bay County, Michigan
Educational institutions established in 1961
Education in Saginaw County, Michigan
Education in Midland County, Michigan
1961 establishments in Michigan
Saginaw Intermediate School District
NJCAA athletics